Dzirkstele is a regional newspaper published in Latvia.

References 

Newspapers published in Latvia